Hou Chunxiao (born 4 August 1988) is a Chinese para table tennis player. She won a gold and a bronze medal at the 2008 Summer Paralympics.

When she was three years old, she lost her right forearm in a traffic accident which also severely damaged three fingers on her left hand.

References

1988 births
Living people
Paralympic table tennis players of China
Chinese female table tennis players
Table tennis players at the 2008 Summer Paralympics
Medalists at the 2008 Summer Paralympics
People from Xiao County
Paralympic gold medalists for China
Paralympic bronze medalists for China
Paralympic medalists in table tennis
Table tennis players from Anhui
Chinese amputees
21st-century Chinese women